Kings Crossing site is an archaeological site that is a type site for the Kings Crossing Phase (950-1050 CE) of the Lower Yazoo Basin Coles Creek chronology.

Location

The site is located four miles north of the center of Vicksburg, between Chickasaw Bayou and the Illinois Central railroad tracks.

Site importance
Mound B has been almost completely leveled, although a small rise can be discerned. Mounds A and C are both roughly  sq. Pottery sampling in the 1950s from Mound A gave the site a historical importance out of all proportion to its size. Test pits from a 1949 excavation of the Holly Bluff site produced an important glimpse of a late "transitional" Coles Creek to Plaquemine assemblage featuring thin tapered rims of polished plain ware and carefully executed varieties of Coles Creek incised and associated types. Although intriguing as pottery, it was not sufficiently integrated strategraphically to postulate a distinct phase. Site sampling from the Kings Crossing site in 1954 supplied the integration and gave the phase a name. Since then, especially in the Tensas Basin, it has become one of the firmest and most easily identifiable ceramic complexes in the Lower Mississippi area.

In 2005 the Kings Crossing site was portrayed on the Vicksburg Floodwall Mural project to represent the American Indian heritage of the region.

See also
Culture, phase, and chronological table for the Mississippi Valley

References

External links

 Animation: Towns and Temples of the Mississippian Culture-5 Sites
 Vicksburg Riverfront Murals

Archaeological sites of the Coles Creek culture
Mounds in Mississippi
Geography of Warren County, Mississippi
Archaeological type sites
1908 archaeological discoveries